The Crater Historic District encompasses National Park Service structures within Haleakala National Park. The buildings include utility structures, employee housing, administration facilities and visitor services facilities. Most were built by the Civilian Conservation Corps to standard Park Service designs in the 1930s. A few World War II era buildings survive from United States Army construction and are included in the historic district. The Crater Historic District was added to the National Register of Historic Places on November 1, 1974.

The Park Service adapted its preferred National Park Service rustic style to the Hawaiian Islands, avoiding the heavy log construction characteristic of the western continental United States parks in favor of a frame-construction interpretation for most buildings. The House of the Sun Visitor Center stands as the closest example of the mainland style of rubble construction with heavy framing. Designed by Park Service architect Merel Sager, it is also one of the few buildings that were not built with CCC labor.

References

Historic districts on the National Register of Historic Places in Hawaii
Geography of Maui
Haleakalā National Park
Civilian Conservation Corps in Hawaii
Rustic architecture in Hawaii
History of Maui
Protected areas established in 1974
1974 establishments in Hawaii
National Register of Historic Places in Maui County, Hawaii
National Register of Historic Places in national parks
Hawaii Register of Historic Places